"Love Sensation" is a song by English boy band 911. It was released in the United Kingdom through Virgin Records on 29 July 1996 as the second single from their debut studio album The Journey (1997). The song was featured on the soundtrack to the 1997 film Casper: A Spirited Beginning.

Chart performance
Released in July 1996, the single reached number 21 on the UK Singles Chart. In the United States, it peaked at number three on the Bubbling Under Hot 100.

Music video
There are three versions of the music video, the UK and two US versions. Both US versions, feature different footage from the film Casper: A Spirited Beginning. and one US version was included as a special feature in the UK VHS release of the film with the other included in the US release but they were omitted from the subsequent DVD releases of the film.

Track listings
 CD single
 "Love Sensation" (Radio Edit) - 3:42
 "Bodyshakin'" (Radio Edit) - 3:48 
 "Love Sensation"  Extended Mix) - 5:42
 "Bodyshakin'" (Extended Mix) - 5:32

 Maxi-single
 "Love Sensation" (Smash Edit) - 3:25 	
 "Love Sensation" (Darrin Friedman Club Mix) - 8:42 
 "Love Sensation" (Album Version) - 3:41

 Vinyl single
 "Love Sensation" (Darrin Friedman Club Mix) - 8:42 	
 "Love Sensation" (Smash Edit) - 3:25 	
 "Love Sensation" (Darrin Friedman Dub Mix) - 7:37 	
 "Love Sensation" (Album Version) - 3:41

Charts

References

External links
Music video (UK version) on YouTube
Music video (U.S. version included in Casper: a Spirited Beginning UK VHS release) on YouTube
Music video (US version as seen in the Casper: a Spirited Beginning US VHS release) YouTube

1990s ballads
1996 singles
1997 singles
911 (English group) songs
Dance-pop songs
EMI Records singles
Virgin Records singles
1995 songs
Song recordings produced by Eliot Kennedy
Casper the Friendly Ghost
Songs written for films